Command Hospitals are major military hospitals in India. There is not more than one in each Command. The Indian Armed Forces have eight Command Hospitals. They are:

See also
List of Armed Forces Hospitals In India

References

Hospital networks in India
Military hospitals in India
Military medical installations
Military installations of India